BRfm was a community radio station serving Brynmawr, Ebbw Vale, Nantyglo and surrounding areas of Blaenau Gwent in south Wales. The station used to broadcast locally on 97.3 FM and online via the station's website.

BRfm (the station's initials stand for Best Radio for Miles) broadcasts from studios and offices at Lakeside in Nantyglo, near Ebbw Vale. The station's output consists of locally focused programming presented and produced by volunteers.

Programming includes local features and specialist music shows, weekly Welsh language programmes, regular sports coverage and national news bulletins from Sky News Radio in London.

External links
Official website
Official TV Site

Defunct radio stations in the United Kingdom
Radio stations in Wales
Radio stations established in 2007
2007 establishments in Wales
Radio stations disestablished in 2018
2018 disestablishments in Wales